Ron Liversidge  is an English former professional footballer who played as a striker for Ossett Town, Bradford City and Buxton.

References

1930s births
Living people
English footballers
Ossett Town F.C. players
Bradford City A.F.C. players
Buxton F.C. players
English Football League players
Association football forwards